Amil Niazi is a Canadian writer, broadcaster and columnist, residing in Toronto, Ontario.

Niazi was a long-time section editor at Vancouver's now defunct alternative weekly Terminal City. She went on to co-found the alternative bi-weekly Only.
Niazi is also the former co-host of Citytv's Ethnosonic and a regular contributor to CBC Radio 3.

Her freelance work has appeared in Vancouver Magazine, The Westender, Harmony Magazine, Mini Magazine and The Loop.

She is an associate producer at Canadian Broadcasting Corporation.

References 

Canadian television personalities
Canadian radio personalities
Canadian women journalists
Canadian women non-fiction writers
Journalists from Toronto
Writers from Toronto
Living people
Year of birth missing (living people)